This is a List of World Championships medalists in para sailing.

Para World Sailing Championships

2.4 Metre

Hansa 303

Men

Women

Sonar (keelboat)

SKUD 18

See also
World Championships in Sailing
World Sailing

References

External links
Sailing competitions

para